Jayhawk (formerly, Jay Hawk) is an unincorporated community in El Dorado County, California.

A post office operated at Jay Hawk from 1860 to 1865.

References

Unincorporated communities in California
Unincorporated communities in El Dorado County, California